Blue Hills Ski Area is located on the western face of Great Blue Hill in Canton, Massachusetts.  This land is part of the Blue Hills Reservation, a state park managed by the DCR.

The summit is served by a double chairlift, while the beginner area has three magic carpet lifts. There is a lodge with food service, restrooms, ski patrol and a small equipment shop. A separate building serves as a rental outlet with locker storage. The hill is popular with high school ski teams, and often hosts races on Big Blue.

The ski area was founded in 1949 after the Metropolitan District Commission received $65,000 for developing a ski area on Great Blue Hill. The area officially opened in 1950 with various additions and improvements throughout the subsequent decades.

While the land and many of the improvements are owned by the Commonwealth of Massachusetts, the management of the area has historically been leased out to a variety of operators.  The 2006–2007 season is the 6th year of a 6-year "lease" to the people (Mr. Al Endriunas) who own and operate Ragged Mountain Resort in New Hampshire. In 2007, the management of Campgaw Mountain, located in Northern, New Jersey started a 5-year lease.

While the lift line ("Beer's Bluff" named for two brothers, Stuart and Stanley Beers, who managed the ski area from the late '60s through the mid '80s) is listed on the trail map, it is currently not maintained for skiing. There has been talk that the trail would be cut for the 2008–2009 season, but the trail remains untouched.  This reduces the total skiable trails to 7.

In the early 1960s the Metropolitan District Commission (MDC, now the DCR) operated the ski area.   There were only two lifts, both rope tows, one on the main slope and one on the "bunny" slope.  During that time the lift ticket cost $0.50 a day.  In approximately 1965 the area was leased to an outside company called Larchmont Engineering who constructed a chair lift and installed snow-making on the main slope and the bunny slope.  Larchmont was an early innovator in the snow-making business and experimented with various hose and gun/nozzle designs on the mountain.

In February 1969 the area was hit with three 2+ ft snow storms, each a week apart.  The snow was so deep that skiing down the "face" of Big Blue (the side facing Route 128) was possible.

Trails:

Beginner: 1

Intermediate: 2

Expert: 5

References

External links
  Blue Hills Ski Area Official site
 Blue Hills Reservation Massachusetts Department of Conservation and Recreation

Buildings and structures in Canton, Massachusetts
Ski areas and resorts in Massachusetts
Sports in Norfolk County, Massachusetts
Tourist attractions in Norfolk County, Massachusetts